Joseph O'Hara may refer to:

 Joseph P. O'Hara (1895–1975), U.S. Representative from Minnesota
 Joseph W. O'Hara (1863–1938), lawyer and judge from Ohio
 Joseph O'Hara (tenor), early 20th century recording artist, see Alice Nadine Morrison